Mushkegowuk Council (pointed: ᐅᒪᐡᑫᑯ ᐅᑭᒫᐎᐎᐣ (omashkeko okimāwiwin); unpointed: ᐅᒪᐡᑫᑯ ᐅᑭᒪᐎᐎᐣ), or officially as the Mushkegowuk Tribal Council, is a non-profit regional chiefs' council representing Cree First Nations in northern Ontario, Canada.  The council, located in Moose Factory, Ontario  provides advisory services and program delivery to its eight member nations.

Council

The council is made up of a representing chief from each of the eight member communities. The chiefs provide political direction to the organization in its strategic planning, government relations and policy development.  To assist in these activities, the council maintains a political and advocacy staff to support its efforts in helping their communities to prosper.  In turn, the council is a member of Nishnawbe Aski Nation, a tribal political organization representing the majority of Treaty 5 and Treaty 9 First Nations in northern Ontario.

The council's current grand chief is Jonathon Solomon. Musician Lawrence "Wapistan" Martin has also previously served as grand chief.

Member First Nations
 Attawapiskat First Nation (ᐋᐦᑕᐙᐱᐢᑲᑐᐎ ᐃᓂᓂᐧᐊᐠ Āhtawāpiskatowi ininiwak)
 Chapleau Cree First Nation (ᔕᑊᓗ ᐃᓂᓂᐗᐠ šaplo ininiwak)
 Fort Albany First Nation (ᐲᐦᑖᐯᒄ ᐃᓕᓕᐗᒃ pîhtâpek ililiwak)
 Kashechewan First Nation (ᑫᔒᒋᐗᓐ ᐃᓕᓕᐗᒃ kêšîciwan ililiwak)
 Missanabie Cree First Nation (ᒪᓯᓈᐴᔾ ᐃᓂᓂᐗᐠ masinâpôy ininiwak)
 Moose Cree First Nation (ᒨᓱᓂᔨ ᐃᓕᓕᐗᒃ môsoniyi ililiwak
 Taykwa Tagamou Nation (ᑕᐟᑾ ᑕᑲᒪᐤ ᐃᓂᓂᐗᐠ tatkwa takamaw ininiwak)
 Weenusk First Nation (ᐐᓈᐢᑯ ᐃᓂᓂᐗᐠ wînâsko ininiwak)

See also
Trick or Treaty?, a documentary film about Treaty 9, featuring Council Grand Chief Stan Louttit

References

External links
 Mushkegowuk Council, Official website
 INAC profile
 Path of the Elders  - Explore Treaty 9, Aboriginal Cree & First Nations history.

First Nations governments in Ontario
Cree governments
First Nations tribal councils